J. J. Newberry Company is a historic five-story building in El Paso, Texas. It was built by the J. Calisher Realty Company in 1911, and it was known as Calisher's. The Calisher company was a store first opened in El Paso in 1881. Early tenants included the YMCA (on the two top floors) and the Border National Bank. It was later renamed for the J.J. Newberry, a five and dime store chain. The building was designed in the Chicago School architectural style by Trost & Trost. It has been listed on the National Register of Historic Places since September 24, 1980.

References

Buildings and structures completed in 1911
Buildings and structures in El Paso, Texas
Chicago school architecture in Texas
National Register of Historic Places in El Paso County, Texas
Trost & Trost buildings